Hemiculterella sauvagei is a species of cyprinid in the genus Hemiculterella that lives in inland wetlands of China. Its numbers are declining; however, it is not considered threatened or endangered.

References

Cyprinidae
Cyprinid fish of Asia
Freshwater fish of China